Mahers may refer to:

 Mahers, Newfoundland and Labrador, a settlement in Canada
 Maher people, a social group of India

See also 
 Maher (disambiguation)